Stoney Fork is an unincorporated community in Bell County, Kentucky, United States. Stoney Fork has a post office with ZIP code 40988, which opened on November 20, 1946.

References

Unincorporated communities in Bell County, Kentucky
Unincorporated communities in Kentucky